Cable Street is a road in the East End of London, England, with several historic landmarks nearby. It was made famous by the Battle of Cable Street in 1936.

Location
Cable Street starts near the edge of London's financial district, the City of London, in south-western Whitechapel and continues on through to central Shadwell and then to south-eastern Stepney, to the junction between Cable Street and Butcher Row in Limehouse. The street is parallel to, and south of, the Docklands Light Railway and Commercial Road, and north of The Highway.

The area is close to Wapping and Shadwell Basin to the south, Tower Hill to the west, and Aldgate to the north. Since many Londoners define their locality by the nearest London Underground stations, the Cable Street area is often referred to as Shadwell.

The street is in the London Borough of Tower Hamlets, in postal district E1. It lies within the parliamentary constituencies of Bethnal Green and Bow and Poplar and Limehouse, currently represented by Rushanara Ali and Jim Fitzpatrick, both of the Labour party.

History 

Cable Street started as a straight path along which hemp ropes were twisted into ships' cables (i.e. ropes).  These supplied the many ships that would anchor in the nearby Pool of London, between London Bridge and Wapping and Rotherhithe. Many other ropewalks can be seen on later maps, showing how demand for ropes grew as shipping increased.

Until Victorian times, the current Cable Street had different names for each of its sections.  From west to east these ran: Cable Street, Knock Fergus, New Road, Back Lane, Blue Gate Fields, Sun Tavern Fields, and Brook Street. Knock Fergus may have been a reference to the large numbers of Irish residents there then, but the name is old – it is found in the St Dunstan Stepney registers in the early 1600s. Also, in the 19th century, the area at the western end of Cable Street was identified as "near Wellclose Square", as this was a well-known landmark, where nautical items were sold. The whole of the central area of the current street was named after St George in the East church and St George in the East parish.

From Victorian times through to the 1950s, Cable Street had a reputation for cheap lodgings, brothels, drinking inns and opium dens.

The last occasion in England when a stake was hammered through a sinner's heart at an official burial, took place at the junction of Cable Street and Cannon Street Road: John Williams was found hanged in his cell, after being arrested as a suspect in the Ratcliff Highway murders.  Local people went along with the claim that he had committed suicide, from guilt of the crimes.  At the time, 1812, suicide was considered to be sinful, and justified him being buried upside down with a stake through his heart.  His skull was found when new gas mains were being laid in August 1886, and was on display for many years in The Crown and Dolphin pub opposite.

On 4 October 1936 a violent confrontation between the Metropolitan Police and local communities on the street was later named the 'Battle of Cable Street'. Communist, anarchist, labour and Jewish groups joined with locals to resist a planned march through the East End by Oswald Mosley's British Union of Fascists.  The East End has traditionally been an area of London with a large Jewish population. It is estimated that around 100,000 Jews from Eastern Europe had fled to the East End in the period 1881–1914. A bus was overturned and used as a barricade, Mosley's car was attacked with bricks, and there was some of the most violent hand-to-hand fighting ever seen in London. The march was eventually abandoned. A large mural (created between 1979 and 1983) on St George's Town Hall, next to Library Place, depicts scenes from the day. A red plaque at Cable Street's junction with Dock Street commemorates the incident.

Landmarks
Listed from west to east:
 Wilton's Music Hall – the world's oldest surviving grand music hall
 Wellclose Square
 St George in the East church
 St George's Recreation Ground
 Mural of the Battle of Cable Street
 St George's town hall
 St George's swimming pool
 Shadwell railway station
 Watney market
 Shadwell fire station
 Blue Gate Fields primary school
 St Mary's church
 Cable Street Studios

Transport
Road

Vehicular traffic is restricted to travel one-way along the whole street, though the direction varies. It is mostly west-bound, but it is east-bound east of Brodlove Lane (itself one-way north-bound). It lies outside of the London congestion charge zone (CCZ).

Bicycle
London Cycle Superhighway 3 runs the length of Cable Street in the form of a two-way segregated cycle track, continuing west into Royal Mint Street (its western terminus). This is well used by cyclists, especially those commuting to the City and Docklands.

Bus

London Buses routes 100 and D3 both pass west-bound through the central part of Cable Street:
 Route 100 connects to Wapping, Liverpool Street, St Paul's Cathedral and Elephant and Castle.
 Route D3 connects to the Isle of Dogs, Limehouse, Wapping and Bethnal Green.
 Route 339 connects to Mile End, Bow and Old Ford from next to Shadwell DLR station.

Rail
The district falls within Transport for London's Travelcard zone 2. The nearest London Underground station is Tower Hill. Opened in 2010, the nearest London Overground stations are Shadwell and Wapping on the East London Line.

The nearest Docklands Light Railway stations are Shadwell and Limehouse (also a National Rail station).

People 
People associated with the area:

Politicians
Members of Parliament, for Bethnal Green and Bow:
 Rushanara Ali, MP, Labour (MP 2010–)
 George Galloway, MP, Respect (MP 2005–2010)
 Oona King, MP, Labour (MP 1997–2005)

Members of Parliament, for Poplar and Canning Town:
 Jim Fitzpatrick, MP, Labour (MP 1997– )

Science and Medicine
 Hannah Billig, MD, GM, MBE, (1901–1987) – a local doctor who became known as "The Angel of Cable Street".  A blue plaque marks her home surgery at number 198, near Cannon Street Road.
 Sir William Henry Perkin, FRS, (1838–1907), chemist who discovered the aniline purple dye mauveine in a hut in the garden of his family's Cable Street home.  A blue plaque marks the site, by the junction with King David Lane.

Sports
 Jack 'Kid' Berg (1909–1991) – Lightweight Champion Boxer, known as the Whitechapel Windmill, born in Cable Street, by Noble Court. A blue plaque marks the site near where he lived.
 Norman Giller, prolific sportswriter, was born in Cable Street in 1940; his 100th book is an autobiography called The Kid from Cable Street
 Bombardier Billy Wells, British and Empire heavyweight boxing champion and Lonsdale Belt winner, and the Rank gongman, was born at 250 Cable Street.

Literary figures Sir Arthur Conan Doyle visited the opium dens as research for his detective character Sherlock Holmes.
 Isaac Rosenberg (1890–1918), poet and painter, lived at 47 Cable Street from 1897 to 1900, when he attended St Paul's School in Wellclose Square. A blue plaque located at 77 Whitechapel High Street commemorates this.
 Oscar Wilde visited the opium dens off Cable Street, near Dellow Street
Artists
 Dan Jones - British artist, collector of children's playground songs and human rights campaigner.

 People inspiring local street names and places
 Thomas Barnardo – Victorian philanthropist who established homes for destitute children, founder of Barnardo's: Barnardo Street
 Nicholas Hawksmoor – architect who designed the church of St George in the East: Hawksmoor Mews
 Nathaniel Heckford – a young doctor who founded a local children's hospital: Heckford Street
 Basil Henriques – philanthropist who worked in the area: Henriques Street
 Harriet Martineau – Victorian journalist and writer, populariser of political economy: Martineau Street
 Daniel Solander – Swedish botanist who travelled with James Cook exploring the Pacific islands: Solander Gardens
 Emanuel Swedenborg – Swedish scientist, philosopher and mystic, in the Georgian era: Swedenborg Gardens (a street and a park)

 Neighbouring streets West of Cable StreetRoyal Mint Street – formerly Rosemary Lane (in 1830)North of Cable Street starting from the west:

Leman Street – formerly White Lion Street, leading to Leman Street, (in 1830)
Mill Yard
Back Church Lane
Pinchin Street – formerly Thomas Street (in 1862).  Historically noteworthy for its curve and arches, showing where the branch of the railway used to run, towards the goods yard to the north west.
Stute Street
Christian Street – the barricade created during the Battle of Cable Street was near this street's junction with Cable Street
Golding Street – formerly Low Grove Street (in 1862)
Cannon Street Road
Watney Market – formerly Watney Street (in 1862)
Watney Street – formerly Charles Street (in 1862)
Cornwall Street – formerly Upper Cornwall Street (in 1862)
Shadwell Gardens
Shadwell Place – formerly Lower Cornwall Street and Sun Court (in 1862)
Sutton Street – formerly Church Road (in 1862)
Martineau Street
Johnson Street
Poonah Street
Hardinge Street
Hardinge Lane
Devonport Street
Barnado Street – formerly James Place (in 1862)
Stepney Causeway
Pitsea Street – formerly Dorset Street (in 1862)
Caroline Street
Ratcliffe Cross Street – formerly Ratcliffe Square and Periwinkle Street (in 1862)
Boulcott Street – formerly George Street (in 1862)
Commercial Road – major radial route into Aldgate – runs parallel to Cable StreetEast of Cable StreetButcher Row – formerly Butcher Row and White Horse Street (in 1862)
Narrow StreetSouth of Cable Street''', starting from the west

Dock Street – already existed as Dock Street in 1830
Ensign Street – formerly Well Street (in 1862)
Graces Alley – between Ensign Street and Wellclose Square – home to Wilton's Music Hall
Fletcher Street – formerly Shorter Street (in 1830 and 1862)
Wellclose Square – already existed as Wellclose Square in 1830 and 1862
Hindmarsh Close
Swedenborg Gardens
Betts Street – formerly connected Cable Street to The Highway (in 1862)
Crowder Street – formerly Denmark Street (in 1862)
Cannon Street Road
Hawksmoor Mews
Bluegate Mews – formerly St George's Place (in 1830)
Library Place – formerly Prospect Place (in 1862)
Angel Court – in 1862, Angel Gardens was where Bewley Street is now.
Dellow Street
Bewley Street – formerly Albert Street (in 1862)
Sage Street
Lowood Street
Solander Gardens
Twine Court
King David Lane
Juniper Street – formerly Juniper Row (in 1862)
Tarbert Walk
Glamis Road
Redcastle Close – formerly Carriage Way (in 1862)
Glamis Place
Brodlove Lane – formerly Love Lane (in 1862)
Elf Row – formerly Elm Row (in 1862)
Glasshouse Fields – formerly Glasshouse Street (in 1862)
Schoolhouse Lane
Heckford Street – formerly Burlington Place (in 1862); no longer connected to Cable Street
Cranford Street – formerly Harris Court (in 1862)
Bere Street – formerly connected through to Butcher Row (in 1862)
Ratcliffe Orchard – formerly The Orchard (in 1862)
The Highway – formerly Ratcliff Highway.  Then St George's Street, High Street (Shadwell), Cock Hill and Broad Street (in 1862).

Similar streets
As Cable Street refers to the fact that originally cables (and such) were made here, often for the maritime industry, it is a name (together with similar names) which can be found in other places (which often have a maritime history):
 Cable Street in Lancaster
 Lijnbaan in Vlaardingen
 Repslagargatan in Stockholm
 Rope Lane in Crewe
 Ropemaker Court in Manchester
 Touwbaan in Leiderdorp and Sliedrecht

References

External links
 Website dedicated to Cable Street, with many videos
 Wiltons Music Hall
 Cable Street on Google Maps

Streets in the London Borough of Tower Hamlets
Whitechapel
Shadwell
Stepney
Wapping